The 1999 German Open was a women's tennis event that was played in Berlin, Germany from 10 May to 16 May 1999. It was one of two Tier I events that took place on red clay in the build-up to the second Grand Slam of the year, the French Open. First-seeded Martina Hingis won the singles title and earned $150,000 first-prize money.

Finals

Singles

 Martina Hingis defeated  Julie Halard-Decugis, 6–0, 6–1
 It was Hingis' 7th title of the year and the 46th of her career.

Doubles

 Alexandra Fusai /  Nathalie Tauziat defeated  Jana Novotná /  Patricia Tarabini, 6–3, 7–5

Entrants

Seeds

Other entrants
The following players received wildcards into the singles main draw:
  Jana Kandarr
  Jennifer Capriati
  Julia Abe

The following players received wildcards into the doubles main draw:
  Anca Barna /  Marlene Weingärtner
  Julia Abe /  Jana Kandarr

The following players received entry from the singles qualifying draw:

  Germana Di Natale
  Miriam Schnitzer
  Sandra Klösel
  Sandra Kleinová
  Sandra Cacic
  Anca Barna
  Sandra Načuk
  Emmanuelle Gagliardi

The following players received entry as lucky losers:
  Mariana Díaz Oliva
  Amanda Hopmans
  Pavlina Stoyanova
  Florencia Labat

The following players received entry from the doubles qualifying draw:
  Germana Di Natale /  Flora Perfetti

The following players received entry as lucky losers:
  Brie Rippner /  Tara Snyder

External links
 ITF tournament edition details
 Tournament draws

WTA German Open
Berlin
WTA German Open
May 1999 sports events in Europe